The 2020 presidential campaign of former U.S. Representative and South Carolina Governor Mark Sanford began on September 8, 2019, when Sanford announced his intention to challenge incumbent President Donald Trump for the Republican nomination in the 2020 election, and ended on November 12. Sanford planned on making the announcement in South Carolina on September 2, but postponed due to Hurricane Dorian. A formal announcement was made on September 8.

In September, Sanford made several campaign stops in his home state of South Carolina (including Greenville, Columbia, and Mount Pleasant) wherein he "debated" with a cardboard cutout of Donald Trump. This was in reaction to the South Carolina Republican Party's decision to forgo a Republican primary in that state. On September 19, Sanford held his first campaign stop in the early primary state of New Hampshire. This was followed by a four-day swing through Iowa that lasted through September 25.

On October 16, 2019, Sanford formally launched his campaign with a week-long, 3,500 mile road trip which started in Philadelphia. Only one person, a reporter from The Philadelphia Inquirer, showed up. The road trip was called "Kids, We’re Bankrupt and We Didn’t Even Know It," and saw Sanford holding a large check for "one trillion dollars" that he hoped would "spark a needed conversation" within the Republican Party about spending and debt.

After failing to gain traction in the race, Sanford ended his presidential bid on November 12. He blamed the ongoing impeachment inquiry against Donald Trump, saying that it "has made my goal of making the debt, deficit and spending issue a part of this presidential debate impossible right now ... nearly everything in Republican Party politics is currently viewed through the prism of impeachment."

References

2020 Republican Party (United States) presidential campaigns